Pierre Hérisson (born 12 June 1945 in Annecy, Haute-Savoie) is a French politician and a member of the Senate of France. He represents the Haute-Savoie department and is a member of the Union for a Popular Movement Party.

References
Page on the Senate website

1945 births
Living people
People from Annecy
French Senators of the Fifth Republic
Union for a Popular Movement politicians
Senators of Haute-Savoie